Belonogaster (belone - "needle", gaster - "belly") is a large genus of mainly Afrotropical quasisocial wasps, although some species occur in Arabia and two extend as far as India. They have characteristics of both the eusocial and the solitary wasps. Belonogaster constructs communal paper nests where the grubs are fed on masticated, soft-bodied insects such as caterpillars. The type species is Belonogaster juncea, which consists of two subspecies: Belonogaster juncea colonialis and Belonogaster juncea juncea. Belanogaster wasps are an important food source for wintering European honey buzzards (Pernis apivorus) in sub-Saharan Africa. In African traditional medicine, wasps of the genus are cooked with plant roots and consumed to cure various childhood sicknesses, as well as having ceremonial use similar to that of honey bees (Apis mellifera). Some birds choose to build their nests near the nests of Belonogaster for protection, including mousebirds and weavers.

Species
The following species are included:

Belonogaster abyssinica Buysson, 1906
Belonogaster acaulis Richards, 1982
Belonogaster adenensis Giordani Soika, 1957
Belonogaster apicalis Saussure, 1900
Belonogaster arabica Giordani Soika, 1958
Belonogaster atrata Schulthess, 1912
Belonogaster aurata Richards, 1982
Belonogaster barbata Richards, 1982
Belonogaster bicolor Saussure, 1900
Belonogaster bimaculata Richards, 1982
Belonogaster brachystoma Kohl, 1894
Belonogaster brevipetiolata Saussure, 1891
Belonogaster brevitarsus Richards, 1982
Belonogaster brunnea Ritsema, 1874
Belonogaster brunnescens Richards, 1982
Belonogaster clypeata Kohl, 1894
Belonogaster dubia Kohl, 1894
Belonogaster eumenoides Saussure, 1891
Belonogaster facialis Buysson, 1908
Belonogaster ferruginea Richards, 1982
Belonogaster filiventris (Saussure, 1853)
Belonogaster flava Richards, 1982
Belonogaster freyi Buysson, 1909
Belonogaster fuscipennis Buysson, 1909
Belonogaster grisea (Fabricius, 1775)
Belonogaster guerini (Saussure, 1853)
Belonogaster hildebrandti Saussure, 1891
Belonogaster hirsuta Richards, 1982
Belonogaster jordani Richards, 1982
Belonogaster juncea (Fabricius, 1781)
Belonogaster keiseri Richards, 1982
Belonogaster kelnerpillautae Richards, 1982
Belonogaster kohli Schulz, 1906
Belonogaster lateritia Gerstaecker, 1855
Belonogaster leonhardii Buysson, 1909
Belonogaster leonina Richards, 1982
Belonogaster levior Richards, 1982
Belonogaster libera Richards, 1982
Belonogaster longitarsus Richards, 1982
Belonogaster macilenta (Fabricius, 1781)
Belonogaster maculata Richards, 1982
Belonogaster madecassa (Saussure, 1853)
Belonogaster maromandia Richards, 1982
Belonogaster meneliki Gribodo, 1879
Belonogaster multipunctata Richards, 1982
Belonogaster neavei Richards, 1982
Belonogaster nigricans Richards, 1982
Belonogaster nitida Richards, 1982
Belonogaster pennata Richards, 1982
Belonogaster petiolata (Degeer, 1778)
Belonogaster pileata Richards, 1982
Belonogaster prasina Saussure, 1891
Belonogaster principalis Richards, 1982
Belonogaster punctata Richards, 1982
Belonogaster punctilla Richards, 1982
Belonogaster pusilloides Richards, 1982
Belonogaster rothkirchi Schulthess, 1914
Belonogaster saeva Saussure, 1891
Belonogaster saussurei Kirby, 1881
Belonogaster somereni Richards, 1982
Belonogaster tarsata Kohl, 1893
Belonogaster turbulenta Kohl, 1894
Belonogaster turgida Kohl, 1894
Belonogaster ugandae Richards, 1982
Belonogaster vasseae Buysson, 1906

References

Traditional African medicine
Vespidae
Hymenoptera of Africa